Zhongkai University of Agriculture and Engineering (Simplified Chinese: 仲恺农业工程学院) is a university in Guangzhou, China that specializes in training agricultural technicians. 

It is named after Liao Zhongkai, a leading figure in the founding of modern China and a close associate of Sun Yat-sen.

Founded in 1927, Zhongkai University is one of Guangzhou's oldest institutions of higher education.

History 
As Zhongkai Agricultural and Industrial School, the university was founded in 1927 in honor of Liao Zhongkai, a close associate of Sun Yat-Sen and a leader in the founding of the Republic of China. He Xiangning, widow of Liao and a noted figure in Chinese revolutionary history, served as the first university president for 15 years.

The university's initial mission was to improve knowledge about agriculture for food production in China but eventually expanded to form a rounded offering of science and liberal arts, while keeping its principal focus on agriculture and engineering.

Construction and development was overseen and supported by a number of China's leaders, including Ye Jianying, Deng Xiao Ping, Yang Shangkun and Wang Shen. Each wrote epigraphs for campus landmarks such as the Liao Zhongkai and He Xiangning Memorial Museum and the Liao Zhongkai Monument.

In March 2008, with the approval of the Chinese Ministry of Education, it was renamed Zhongkai University of Agriculture and Engineering.

Departments

Departments offering Master’s degrees 
 Biochemicals
 Agricultural Product Processing and Storage Engineering
 Phytopathology
 Ornamental Plants and Horticulture
 Plant Protection
 Plant Processing and Security

Undergraduate departments 
 College of Agronomy
 College of Horticulture and Landscape Architecture
 College of Light Industry and Food Science
 Information College
 College of Computer Science and Engineering
 College of Urban Construction
 College of Life Sciences
 College of Economics and Trade
 College of Management
 College of Chemistry and Chemical Engineering

Research institutes 
Zhongkai University hosts 56 research bodies, responsible for hundreds of research projects funded at the national and local levels. A sample of the research groups includes:

 Floriculture Research Center
 Institute of Green Chemistry 
 Institute of Biotechnology 
 Institute of Plant Pathology
 Institute of Farm Products Processing and Preservation 
 Institute of Industrial Economics
 Institute of Higher Education
 Institute of Zhongkai University Culture
 Institute of Artificial Environment and Control 
 Institute of Green Engineering
 Institute of Seed Science and Engineering
 Institute of Crops

Recent research projects to win national- and provincial-level awards have included:
 Long-lasting, biodegradable resins to help irrigate soil in dry climates
 Basic research for controlling bactrocera dorsalis (oriental fruit fly)
 Synthesis of N-vinyl pyrrolidone catalytic systems
 Introduction and promotion of new kiwi fruit strains
 Production and application of water-absorbing agents
 Crucial technology for the cultivation of cut flowers in the Pearl River Delta
 Multifunctional fertilizers and preservatives for ornamental plants
 Eco-restoration techniques for strip-mined terrain
 Production and application of efficient molluscicides

See also
 Liao Zhongkai

External links
  Official Website

Universities and colleges in Guangdong
Haizhu District
Educational institutions established in 1927
1927 establishments in China